KSV or kSv may refer to:

 Karyakshama Seva Vibhushanaya (Efficient Service Decoration), a Sri Lanka military medal
 Karlsruher SV Rugby, a German club
 Kieler Sportvereinigung Holstein, a football club, Kiel, Schleswig-Holstein, Germany
 Kilosievert, a unit of radiation
 Springvale Airport (Queensland), IATA airport code "KSV"